The Unicorn Cave is the largest show cave in the West Harz, about  northwest of Scharzfeld in the borough of Herzberg am Harz in central Germany. It is a karst cave developed in dolomite strata that is part of the Zechstein.

History 

The cave was first mentioned in the records in 1541. In 1686 Gottfried Wilhelm Leibniz visited the cave and wrote a report about it mentioning the local trade with unicorn artefacts. In those days fossilized bones supposed to be from unicorns were ground and used for making medicine. In the 17th century Otto von Guericke, the mayor of Magdeburg, wrote a newspaper article about the finding of some ancient animal bones in the Zeunickenberg, a Harz mountain near Quedlinburg, in which he held the opinion that the bones were the remains of a unicorn. Based on Guerickes writings Leibniz drew a fictional reconstruction of the unicorn's skeleton using the bones that had been found in the cave and published the drawing in his book Protagaea.

In 1872 Rudolf Virchow carried out an excavation there and determined that the unknown bones actually stem from extinct animals like mammoths and cave bears. Over 70 species of animal have been identified from the many bones that have been found, including 60 species of mammal; amongst them the cave lion and the wolf.

In 1905 the Unicorn Cave was made accessible to visitors by the construction of an entrance gallery. Since then  of the total length of  have been opened up as a show cave. The Unicorn Cave is one of the three information centres of the Harz – Brunswick Land – Eastphalia National Geopark.

The Unicorn Cave has a checkpoint (no. 101) which is part of the Harzer Wandernadel network of hiking trails.

In 2021 the Giant deer bone of Einhornhöhle was found in the cave, the oldest piece of European art ever discovered, and attributed to Neanderthals.

Legend 
According to a legend the discovery of the cave was linked to the nearby rock church at Scharzfeld. In the cave-like rock church it is said that in heathen times there lived an old and wise woman who helped people in search of for advice. One day she was driven away by a monk in a black habit in the company of Frankish warriors. A unicorn was supposed to have protected her from her pursuers. The woman joined the witches' community on the Witches' Dance Floor on the Brocken mountain. Thereafter the black monk disappeared into a hole in the ground which led to the discovery of the Unicorn Cave.
In fact the cave had been known about since the Stone Age and had never been forgotten.

See also 

 List of show caves in Germany

References

Sources 
 Ernst Andreas Friedrich: Naturdenkmale Niedersachsens. Hannover, 1980.

External links

 Unicorn Cave: English home page 
 Unicorn Cave at www.showcaves.com. 
 Unicorn Cave: German home page 
 Ralf Nielbock: The Unicorn Cave near Scharzfeld/Harz (pdf) (191 kB) 
 Description of the cave 

Show caves in Germany
Caves of the Harz
Landforms of Lower Saxony
Tourist attractions in Lower Saxony
Unicorns
Caves of Germany